In combustion, Frank-Kamenetskii theory explains the thermal explosion of a homogeneous mixture of reactants, kept inside a closed vessel with constant temperature walls. It is named after a Russian scientist David A. Frank-Kamenetskii, who along with Nikolay Semenov developed the theory in the 1930s.

Problem descriptionLinan, Amable, and Forman Arthur Williams. "Fundamental aspects of combustion." (1993).Buckmaster, John David, and Geoffrey Stuart Stephen Ludford. Theory of laminar flames. Cambridge University Press, 1982.

Consider a vessel maintained at a constant temperature , containing a homogeneous reacting mixture. Let the characteristic size of the vessel be . Since the mixture is homogeneous, the density  is constant. Assuming a one-step global reaction , where  is the amount of heat released per unit mass of fuel consumed, and a reaction rate governed by Arrhenius law, the energy equation becomes

where

Non-dimensionalization
Non-dimensional scales of time, temperature, length, and heat transfer may be defined as

where

Note
In a typical combustion process,  so that .
Therefore, . That is, fuel consumption time is much longer than ignition time, so fuel consumption is essentially negligible in the study of ignition.
This is why the fuel concentration is assumed to remain the initial fuel concentration .

Substituting the non-dimensional variables in the energy equation from the introduction

Since , the exponential term can be linearized , hence

Semenov theory

Before Frank-Kamenetskii, his doctoral advisor Nikolay Semyonov (or Semenov) proposed a thermal explosion theory with a simpler model with which he assumed a linear function for the heat conduction process instead of the Laplacian operator. Semenov's equation reads as

in which the exponential term  will tend to increase  as time proceeds whereas the linear term  will tend to decrease . The relevant importance between the two terms are determined by the Damköhler number .

Steady-state regime
At steady state, the balance is given by the equation

where  represents the Lambert W function. From the properties of Lambert W function, it is easy to see that the steady state temperature provided by the above equation exists only when , where  is called as Frank-Kamenetskii parameter as a critical point where the system bifurcates from the existence of steady state to explosive state at large times.

Explosive regime
For , the system explodes since the exponential term dominates as time proceeds. This time is interpreted as the ignition time or induction time of the system. When , the heat conduction term  can be neglected in which case the problem admits an explicit solution,

At time , the system explodes. This time is also referred to as the adiabatic induction period since the heat conduction term  is neglected. 

In the near-critical condition, i.e., when , the system takes very long time to explode. The analysis for this limit was first carried out by Frank-Kamenetskii., although proper asymptotics were carried out only later by D. R. Kassoy and Amable Liñán including reactant consumption because reactant consumption is not negligible when . A simplified analysis without reactant consumption is presented here. Let us define a small parameter  such that . The quantity of interest is the long-time estimate for the explosion. To find out the estimate, introduce the transformations  and  that is appropriate for the region where  stays close to  into the governing equation and collect only the leading-order terms to find out

where the boundary condition is derived by matching with the initial region wherein . The solution to the above-mentioned problem is given by

Frank-Kamenetskii steady-state theoryLewis, Bernard, and Guenther Von Elbe. Combustion, flames and explosions of gases. Elsevier, 2012.

The only parameter which characterizes the explosion is the Damköhler number . When  is very high, conduction time is longer than the chemical reaction time and the system explodes with high temperature since there is not enough time for conduction to remove the heat. On the other hand, when  is very low, heat conduction time is much faster than the chemical reaction time, such that all the heat produced by the chemical reaction is immediately conducted to the wall, thus there is no explosion, it goes to an almost steady state, Amable Liñán coined this mode as slowly reacting mode. At a critical Damköhler number  the system goes from slowly reacting mode to explosive mode. Therefore, the system is in steady state. Instead of solving the full problem to find this , Frank-Kamenetskii solved the steady state problem for various Damköhler number until the critical value, beyond which no steady solution exists. So the problem to be solved is

 

with boundary conditions

the second condition is due to the symmetry of the vessel. The above equation is special case of Liouville–Bratu–Gelfand equation in mathematics.

Planar vessel

For planar vessel, there is an exact solution. Here , then

Integrating once and using the second boundary condition, the equation becomes

and integrating again

The above equation is the exact solution, but  maximum temperature is unknown, but we have not used the boundary condition of the wall yet.

Cylindrical vessel

For cylindrical vessel, there is an exact solution. Though Frank-Kamentskii used numerical integration assuming there is no explicit solution, Paul L. Chambré provided an exact solution in 1952. H. Lemke also solved provided a solution in a somewhat different form in 1913. Here , then

But  from the symmetry condition at the centre. Writing back in original variable, the equation reads,

Now subtracting the last two equation from one another leads to

This equation is easy to solve because it involves only the derivatives, so letting  transforms the equation

This is a Bernoulli differential equation of order , a type of Riccati equation. The solution is

Integrating once again, we have  where . We have used already one boundary condition, there is one more boundary condition left, but with two constants . Therefore, the solution is

The maximum temperature  occurs at 

Spherical vessel

For spherical vessel, there is no known explicit solution, so Frank-Kamenetskii used numerical methods to find the critical value. Here , then

 

The above equation is nothing but Emden–Chandrasekhar equation, which appears in astrophysics describing isothermal gas sphere. Unlike planar and cylindrical case, the spherical vessel has infinitely many solutions for  oscillating about the point , instead of just two solutions, which was shown by Israel Gelfand. The lowest branch will be chosen to explain explosive behavior.

Non-symmetric geometries

For vessels which are not symmetric about the center (for example rectangular vessel), the problem involves solving a nonlinear partial differential equation instead of a nonlinear ordinary differential equation, which can be solved only through numerical methods in most cases. The equation is

with boundary condition  on the bounding surfaces.

Applications

Since the model assumes homogeneous mixture, the theory is well applicable to study the explosive behavior of solid fuels (spontaneous ignition of bio fuels, organic materials, garbage, etc.,). This is also used to design explosives and fire crackers. The theory predicted critical values accurately for low conductivity fluids/solids with high conductivity thin walled containers.

See also
Clarke's equation

References

External links
 The Frank-Kamenetskii problem in Wolfram solver http://demonstrations.wolfram.com/TheFrankKamenetskiiProblem/
 Tracking the Frank-Kamenetskii Problem in Wolfram solver http://demonstrations.wolfram.com/TrackingTheFrankKamenetskiiProblem/
 Planar solution in Chebfun solver http://www.chebfun.org/examples/ode-nonlin/BlowupFK.html

Fluid dynamics
Combustion
Explosions